Rayos de Hermosillo is a Mexican professional basketball club based in Hermosillo, Sonora. The Rayos play in the Circuito de Baloncesto de la Costa del Pacífico (CIBACOPA) and play their home games at the Gimnasio del Estado.

They have won three league titles (2012, 2013, 2019).

History
The Rayos won back-to-back titles after defeating Ostioneros de Guaymas in 2012 and Garra Cañera de Navolato in 2013, both in seven-game series.

In 2019, the Rayos faced the Mantarrayas de La Paz in the league finals. After going down 2 games to 3, Hermosillo defeated La Paz 99–59 in game six before taking game seven by a score of 90–77 to win their third league title in eight years. Terrence Drisdom and Jeremy Hollowell led the team in scoring with 22 and 19 points, respectively, with Hollowell being named Finals MVP.

Media
Rayos home games have been broadcast across the internet since 2010. In 2014, they reached a deal with Megacable to broadcast their home games on television, and they have since switched to Telemax.

Notable players
- Set a club record or won an individual award as a professional player.
- Played at least one official international match for his senior national team at any time.
  Steve Monreal
  Myck Kabongo
  Emmanuel Little
  Alfonzo McKinnie

References

External links
Official site
Team profile at RealGM.com

Basketball teams established in 2008
2008 establishments in Mexico
Basketball teams in Mexico
Sports teams in Sonora
Sport in Hermosillo